Bond Lake (Ontario) is a  glacial kettle lake in the Oak Ridges Moraine. It is located on the east side of Yonge Street in the north end of Richmond Hill, Ontario.

History

Prior to the late 1800 the lake was surrounded by farms by various land holders: Whitneys' and Mortons', (William) Websters, whom acquired from Chief Justice Sir John Robinson, 1st Baronet, of Toronto with tenant lease to James Legge. In the 1790s (1794 and 1797) 200 acres around the lake was granted to former Queen's York Rangers Sergeant William Bond. Initially called Bond's Pond and later as Bond Lake. William Bell would sell his portion to developers responsible for Bond Lake Park.

Bond Lake Park was a recreation park from 1899 to 1929 owned by the Metropolitan Street Railway (Toronto) (MSR). The park closed as the MSR was owned by the Toronto Transportation Commission (since 1922) and had little interest in owning non transit assets.

Today the lake and lands are part of a 175 acres Oakridges Corridor Conservation Reserves under the Toronto Region Conservation Authority.

See also
 Preston Lake
 Lake Wilcox

References

Richmond Hill, Ontario
Bond Lake
Landforms of the Regional Municipality of York